Obława (Manhunt) is a 2012 Polish film, which was named Best Film at the 2013 Polish Film Awards.

The World War II drama, set in Poland, was directed by Marcin Krzyształowicz, and its primary actors include Marcin Dorociński, Maciej Stuhr, Weronika Rosati (nominated for Polish Academy Award for Best Actress), and Sonia Bohosiewicz.  In addition to its Polish Film Awards win for Best Picture, it also won for Best Cinematography, Best Sound Design, and Best Sound Editing.

It also won the Silver Lion prize at the Gdynia Film Festival in May 2012, where it debuted, and was released to Polish theatres generally on 19 October 2012.  It was first screened outside Poland at the 2012 Montreal World Film Festival.

Cast 
 Marcin Dorociński - Wydra
 Maciej Stuhr - Henryk Kondolewicz
 Sonia Bohosiewicz - Hanna Kondolewiczowa
 Weronika Rosati - Pestka
 Andrzej Zieliński - Mak
 Bartosz Zukowski - Waniek
  - Rudzielec
  - Cook
  - Szumlas
  - Ludwina

References

External links
 

2012 films
2012 drama films
Polish drama films
2010s Polish-language films